Amdahl Corporation was an information technology company which specialized in IBM mainframe-compatible computer products, some of which were regarded as supercomputers competing with those from Cray Research. Founded in 1970 by Gene Amdahl, a former IBM computer engineer best known as chief architect of System/360, it was a wholly owned subsidiary of Fujitsu since 1997. The company was located in Sunnyvale, California.

From its first machine in 1975, Amdahl's business was to provide mainframe computers that were plug-compatible with contemporary IBM mainframes, but offering higher reliability, running somewhat faster, and costing somewhat less. They often had additional practical advantages as well, in terms of size, power requirements, of being air-cooled instead of requiring a chilled water supply. This offered a price/performance ratio superior to the IBM lineup, and made Amdahl one of the few real competitors to "Big Blue" in the very high-margin computer market segment. The company won about 8% of the mainframe business worldwide, but was a market leader in some regions, most notably in the Carolinas. Proverbially, savvy IBM customers liked to have Amdahl coffee mugs visible in their offices when IBM salespeople came to visit.

As the mainframe market began to change in the later 1980s, Amdahl was increasingly diversified, becoming a major supplier of UNIX and open systems software and servers, data storage subsystems, data communications products, application development software, and a variety of educational and consulting services.

Company origins 

Amdahl launched its first product in 1975, the Amdahl 470/6, which competed directly against high-end models in IBM's then-current System/370 family. When IBM announced the introduction of Dynamic Address Translation (DAT), Amdahl announced the 470V/6 and dropped the 470/6. At the time of its introduction, the 470V/6 was less expensive but still faster than IBM's comparable offerings. The first two 470V/6 machines were delivered to NASA (Serial Number 00001) and the University of Michigan (Serial Number 00002). For the next quarter-century Amdahl and IBM competed aggressively against one another in the high-end mainframe market. At its peak, Amdahl had a 24% market share. Amdahl owed some of its success to antitrust settlements between IBM and the U.S. Department of Justice, which ensured that Amdahl's customers could license IBM's mainframe software under reasonable terms.

Gene Amdahl was committed to expanding the capabilities of the uniprocessor mainframe during the late 1970s and early 1980s. Amdahl engineers, working with Fujitsu circuit designers, developed unique, air-cooled chips which were based on high-speed emitter-coupled logic (ECL) circuit macros. These chips were packaged in a chip package with a heat-dissipating cooling attachment (that looked like the heat-dissipating fins on a motorcycle engine) mounted directly on the top of the chip. This patented technology allowed the Amdahl mainframes of this era to be completely air-cooled, unlike IBM systems that required chilled water and its supporting infrastructure.

In the 470 systems, the chips were mounted in a 6-by-7 array on multi-layer cards (up to 14 layers), which were then mounted in vertical columns. The cards had eight connectors that attached the micro-coaxial cables that interconnected the system components. A conventional backplane was not used in the central processing units. The card columns held at least three cards per side (two per column in rare exceptions, such as the processor's "C-Unit"). Each column had two large "Tarzan" fans (a "pusher" and a "puller") to move the considerable amount of air needed to cool the chips. Each system included a Data General Nova 1200 programmed to support the CRT console and to accept the same channel command operations as the IBM 3066 on the 370/165 and 370/168.

Additional models of Amdahl uniprocessor systems included the 470V/5, /7 and /8 systems. The 470V/8, first shipped in 1980, incorporated high speed 64 KB cache memories to improve performance, and the first real hardware-based virtualization (known as the "Multiple Domain Facility").

Amdahl also pioneered a variable-speed feature - the '470 accelerator' - on the /5 and /7 systems that allowed the customer to run the CPUs at the higher level of performance of the /6 and /8 systems, respectively, when desired. The customer was charged by the number of hours used. Some at Amdahl thought this feature would anger customers, but it became quite popular as customer management could now control expenses while still having greater performance available when necessary.

In the 580 systems, the chips were mounted in an 11-by-11 array on multi-layer boards called Multi-Chip Carriers (MCCs) that were positioned in high-airflow for cooling. The MCCs were mounted horizontally in a large rectangular frame. The MCCs slid into a complex physical connection system. The processor "side panels" interconnected the system, providing clock propagation delays that maintained race-free synchronous operation at relatively high clock frequencies (15–18  ns base clock cycles). This processor box was cooled by high-speed fans generating horizontal air flow across the MCCs.

Gene Amdahl left the company he founded in August 1979 to start Trilogy Systems. With Gene Amdahl's departure, and increasing influence from Fujitsu, Amdahl entered the large-scale multiprocessor market in the mid-1980s with the 5860, 5870 (attached processor) and 5880 (full multiprocessor) models.

Along the way, Amdahl came to believe that its best bet at competing with IBM head-to-head was to "bulk up," in particular, executing a merger with a well-known vendor in the enterprise storage space. Most Amdahl mainframe customers would purchase storage devices (hard disk and tape drives) from IBM or its plug-compatible competitors. Amdahl first attempted a merger with one of the largest of these vendors, Memorex, in 1979. After this deal fell through, Amdahl went much further on a deal to merge with Colorado-based Storage Technology Corporation (STC). The deal was approved by the boards of both companies, and detailed plans were in place to implement the merger, when Fujitsu, an important partner and major shareholder of Amdahl at the time, objected to the deal which forced it to collapse. STC later tried to develop its own mainframe computer, the failure of which contributed to it filing for Chapter 11 bankruptcy in 1984. Around that same time, Amdahl agreed to allow Fujitsu to acquire just under half of Amdahl, leading to its ultimate acquisition of all of Amdahl's shares some years later.

In the 1980s, Amdahl entered the IBM-compatible peripherals business in front-end processors and storage products, shipping its first 4705 communications controller in August 1980 and its first 6000 DASD in August 1982. These products were very successful for a number of years with the support of Jack Lewis, the former CEO of Amdahl. The reliance upon a limited product line, restricted to containment within the complex business of mainframes and their highly valuable peripherals, constrained the company's hardware business when market forces shifted to x86-based processors. This had been foreseen, leading to an increasing emphasis on software and consulting services.

Market exit 
By the early 1990s, Amdahl was suffering losses of several hundred million dollars per quarter as a result of declining mainframe sales. Management decided to lay off 900 employees in 1992, 1,100 in early 1993, and another 1,800 (out of the 7,400 remaining) later in that year, as well as canceling hardware development projects in favor of reselling computers from Sun Microsystems.

Amdahl perhaps enjoyed its best success during IBM's transition from bipolar to CMOS technology in the early to mid-1990s. The first generations of IBM's CMOS mainframe processors, the IBM 9672 G3 and G4, could not perform as well as those from the Enterprise System/9000 family, which were based on bipolar technology, giving Amdahl a temporary advantage. However, IBM's CMOS strategy paid off in the long run, allowing IBM's Poughkeepsie factory to produce even faster mainframes at a lower cost as the technology matured. By the time IBM introduced its 64-bit zSeries 900 in 2000, Amdahl's hardware business could no longer compete with IBM with its Millennium and OmniFlex servers that only had 31-bit-addressing. In late 2000, Fujitsu/Amdahl announced that the company had no plans to invest the estimated US$1 billion (or more) to create an IBM-compatible 64-bit system.

Amdahl also failed in its effort to introduce its ObjectStar software (initially known as Huron) during this period and the product later became the object of a successful management buyout. ObjectStar was subsequently acquired by the integration software vendor TIBCO in 2005.

Amdahl customer options 
z/OS 1.5 is the last release of IBM's flagship operating system still able to run on 31-bit mainframes, including Amdahl and older IBM systems. IBM effectively ended support for z/OS 1.5 on March 29, 2007. In May 2006, IBM announced that the next version of z/VSE, Version 4, would require a 64-bit system, signaling the end to 31-bit support for that operating system. z/TPF, which became available in December 2005, also requires a 64-bit system. The 31-bit Linux distributions will survive as long as the open source community and distributors have an interest. So while there is still some potential life for Amdahl's hardware, the transition to 64-bit systems is essentially complete.  Some companies and governments still had Amdahl systems performing useful work into mid-2006, and Fujitsu/Amdahl promised support to those customers with replacement parts and other services through March 31, 2009.

Arguably IBM did not have a suitable replacement model for many Amdahl customers until the May 2004 introduction of the zSeries 890. The previous zSeries 800 also became an attractive replacement for Amdahl machines by late 2005 as that model's typical used price fell below $100,000 and continued to fall. The System z9 BC model, introduced in May 2006, increased IBM's attractiveness yet again, and the BC drove z800 and z890 prices down even more. The late 2008 introduction of the IBM System z10 BC yet again made IBM's equipment more enticing. In fact, Fujitsu/Amdahl now sells used IBM mainframes and offers services to migrate customers to the IBM machines (This migration is straightforward and comparable to upgrading from one IBM model to a newer IBM model). The IBM z13 is the last z Systems server to support running an operating system in ESA/390 architecture mode; z14, and future machines will support only 64-bit operating systems. Other, generally less attractive options include running without support, rewriting applications, or possibly running applications under FLEX-ES. FLEX-ES is a mainframe instruction set emulator that supports ESA/390 and, in some cases, z/Architecture operating systems and software.

The vestiges of Amdahl's ESA/390 emulation project were resurrected under a new name: Platform Solutions Inc. Using capital from Intel, Hewlett-Packard, Microsoft, and other major investors they designed a line of Itanium-based computers and software to emulate z/Architecture machines so that they could run zSeries operating systems, with zSeries channels for attaching real IBM equipment as well as virtual simulators for most hardware to minimize the need for IBM's peripheral equipment.   Its LPARs hosted not only IBM operating systems but 64-bit Intel Itanium Linux, HP-UX, Solaris, and potentially other operating systems.

Platform Solutions started shipping its machines in the first quarter of 2007. This action precipitated a lawsuit from IBM, citing patent infringement and PSI's failure to negotiate a z/Architecture license, and IBM refused to license its operating systems and software on PSI's machines. Platform Solutions countered that by "tying" the sale of its software to the sale of its hardware, IBM was in violation of its prior anti-trust agreement with the U.S. Justice Dept.  In July 2008, IBM acquired PSI, and both companies dropped their lawsuits against each other.  PSI's machines are no longer available.

Fujitsu GS21
Fujitsu continues to sell its "GlobalServer" (GS21) mainframe models in the Japanese domestic market. The GS21 machines are essentially ESA/390 (31-bit) instruction set processors largely based on Amdahl-designed technologies but are only compatible with Fujitsu's domestic market operating systems: OSIV/MSP-EX and OSIV/XSP. MSP is most similar to classic IBM MVS/ESA, and XSP is most similar to classic IBM VSE/ESA. Fujitsu GS21 mainframe hardware would most closely correspond to the late 1990s IBM G5 or G6 mainframes in terms of their instruction set support. Fujitsu has stated the company has no intention to license or implement z/Architecture (64-bit).

Fujitsu will discontinue their GS21 mainframe with end-of-sale in 2030, and end-of-support in 2035 "to promote customer modernization".

See also 
 Amdahl UTS
 IBM ESA/390
 Magnuson Computer Systems
 Trilogy Systems

Notes

References

External links 
 Amdahl 470V/6 Machine Reference, 50 pages, 1975, PDF/A, 7.8MB.
 Amdahl 470V/6-II Machine Reference Manual, 50 pages, March 1978, PDF/A, 9.4MB.
 Amdahl 470V/8 Computing System Machine Reference Manual, April 1981, PDF/A, 3.8MB.
 Several Amdahl publications are available online as PDFs from Bitsavers.org.
 Amdahl 470V/6, P2 is in storage at the Computer History Museum, catalog X436.84A.
 Photographs of an Amdahl 470V/6 at the Computer History Museum, Mountain View, California.
 Photographs of an Amdahl 470V/6 at the University of Michigan.
 Photographs of an Amdahl 5860 at the University of Newcastle, 1984–1992.
 Oral history interview with Gene Amdahl Charles Babbage Institute, University of Minnesota, Minneapolis.  Amdahl discusses his graduate work at the University of Wisconsin, his role in the design of several computers for IBM including the STRETCH, IBM 701, 701A, and IBM 704. He discusses his work with Nathaniel Rochester.
 Fujitsu GS21 – System/390 Compatible Servers, former Amdahl.
 Fujitsu GS servers, MSP and XSP roadmap

American companies established in 1970
American companies disestablished in 1997
Defunct computer hardware companies
Defunct computer companies of the United States
Defunct companies based in the San Francisco Bay Area
Computer companies established in 1970
Companies based in Sunnyvale, California
Computer companies disestablished in 1997
1997 mergers and acquisitions
1970 establishments in California
1997 disestablishments in California
Fujitsu subsidiaries
American subsidiaries of foreign companies